Barak Village (is a village in  Sardaran District, Nehbandan County, South Khorasan Province, Iran. At the 2006 census, its population was 305, in 102 families.

Barak village

Barak village is about 125 km south-west of Birjand city and 95 km of north-west of Nehbandan city, with a population of 100 households, approximately. It is the 2nd largest village in the "Arab Khaneh" local area. The geographic position of Barak is: N” 22.53’4°32 and E”28.42’25°59.
This village is closed in by Siyah Kamar Mountain from the south western side, Barak Mountain from the north side and Gel Kan Mountain from the east side.

"Barak" as defined in the Moein dictionary:
1- Barak: Sohail star
2- Barak: 
2-1- The type of thick stuff that is knitted from camel or goat's hair in the Khorasan zone. 
2-2- A part of a carpet. 
2-3- The short clothing that is made by the Gailan people.

Historical: It is not clearly a ruin of Barak village, but Christian cemeteries were caused to be around villages. Barak's history goes back about 400 years, approximately.

Weather: The weather of Barak is warm and dry climate. Spring season is verdant and beautiful, causing growth of pasture, plants, and grass. Also, summer season is hot! Air temperature is up to 35 degrees °C in the later days of summer, and there is dust on half of the weekdays at least. Air temperature at night fluctuates between 15 and 20 °C. However, autumn season gives cold and dry weather to Barak people, but winter is very cold and rainfall is very little.

References 

[

Populated places in Nehbandan County